The 2018 U-20 Copa CONMEBOL Libertadores was the 4th edition of the U-20 Copa CONMEBOL Libertadores (also referred to as the U-20 Copa Libertadores), South America's premier under-20 club football tournament organized by CONMEBOL. The tournament was held in Uruguay from 10 to 24 February 2018.

Nacional defeated Independiente del Valle in the final to win their first title, while River Plate defeated defending champions São Paulo to finish third.

Teams
The competition was contested by 12 teams: the title holders, the youth champions from each of the ten CONMEBOL member associations, and one additional team from the host association.

Players must be born on or after 1 January 1998.

Venues
The tournament was played at the Estadio Centenario in Montevideo.

Draw
The draw was held on 25 January 2018, 16:00 UYT (UTC−3), at the headquarters of the Uruguayan Football Association. The 12 teams were drawn into three groups of four. The defending champions São Paulo were automatically seeded into Pot 1 and allocated to position A1 in the group stage, while the other two teams which also participated in the 2016 U-20 Copa Libertadores, Independiente del Valle and Libertad, were also seeded into Pot 1 and drawn to position B1 or C1 in the group stage. The remaining teams were seeded into Pot 2, and drawn to positions 2, 3 or 4 of groups A, B or C in the group stage. Teams from the same association could not be drawn into the same group.

Group stage
In the group stage, the teams were ranked according to points (3 points for a win, 1 point for a draw, 0 points for a loss). If tied on points, tiebreakers were applied in the following order (Regulations Article 20):
Goal difference;
Goals scored;
Head-to-head result in games between tied teams;
Penalty shoot-out (between two teams playing against each other in the last match of the group)
Drawing of lots.

The winners of each group and the best runner-up among all groups advanced to the semi-finals.

All times local, UYT (UTC−3).

Group A

Group B

Group C

Ranking of group runners-up

Knockout stage
The semi-final matchups were:
Group A winner vs. Group C winner
Group B winner vs. Best runner-up
The semi-final winners and losers played in the final and third place match respectively. If tied after full time, extra time was not played, and the penalty shoot-out was used to determine the winner (Regulations Article 22).

Bracket

Semi-finals

Third place match

Final

Notes

References

External links
CONMEBOL Libertadores Sub 20 Uruguay 2018, CONMEBOL.com

2018
U-20
2018 in youth association football
2018 in South American football
2018 in Uruguayan football
International club association football competitions hosted by Uruguay
Youth sport in Uruguay
February 2018 sports events in South America